Helena is a town in southeastern Alfalfa County, Oklahoma, United States.  Residents pronounce the town's name with a long E: "Heh-LEE'-nuh."  The population was 1,403 at the 2010 census.

It is the site of the James Crabtree Correctional Center, run by the Oklahoma Department of Corrections, with a population of 1,003 inmates in 2010.  It is the site of the Timberlake Public School district's high school, shared with the nearby towns of Goltry, Jet, Nash, and Nescutunga.

History
In June 1915, Helen S. Monroe received a postal designation for Helena.  Monroe became the first postmaster and the town's namesake.

Shortly after the Cherokee Outlet opened to settlement, numerous small communities emerged in what was then southwestern Woods County (now Alfalfa county).  When the Arkansas Valley and Western Railway survey bypassed the nearby settlement of Carwile, those residents began migrating closer to the proposed railroad, near where H. H. Anderson had established a store around 1896. The townsite was laid out nearby in 1902, and the village was incorporated the following year, by which time the population was 160.

The Woods County High School, one of only two in Oklahoma Territory at that time, was constructed in 1903 and opened in 1904 with 400 students.  On January 6, 1904, the Arkansas Valley and Western Railway (part of the St. Louis and San Francisco Railway system) reached Helena.  Growing fast, by mid-1905 it was estimated that 700 residents supported two banks, two schools, two newspapers, four grain elevators, a flour mill, and two lumberyards.  By 1909, there were Baptist, Christian, Methodist, and Presbyterian churches.  The 1910 census showed 760 residents, a number which had increased to 776 by 1940.

Helena Mammoth
In July 2013, the remains of a mammoth were found two miles northwest of Helena by workers of Access Midstream, a natural gas provider, on land owned by brothers Dr. Michael Thorp and Tom Thorp. Oklahoma State University geographer Carlos Cordova, and geography doctoral student Tom Cox excavated the site from September 2013 until October 2013. Oklahoma State University has plans to display the mammoth, which was donated by the Thorp's.

Geography
Helena is located at  (36.546478, -98.270558).

Helena lies along State Highway 58.

Climate

Demographics

As of the census of 2000, there were 443 people, 177 households, and 120 families residing in the town. There were 211 housing units at an average density of 563.8 per square mile (220.2/km2). The racial makeup of the town was 94.58% White, 0.45% African American, 1.35% Native American, 0.45% from other races, and 3.16% from two or more races. Hispanic or Latino of any race were 1.81% of the population.

There were 177 households, out of which 31.6% had children under the age of 18 living with them, 57.1% were married couples living together, 7.3% had a female householder with no husband present, and 32.2% were non-families. 29.4% of all households were made up of individuals, and 14.7% had someone living alone who was 65 years of age or older. The average household size was 2.36 and the average family size was 2.90.

In the town, the population was spread out, with 24.8% under the age of 18, 7.2% from 18 to 24, 21.2% from 25 to 44, 23.7% from 45 to 64, and 23.0% who were 65 years of age or older. The median age was 42 years. For every 100 females, there were 75.8 males. For every 100 females age 18 and over, there were 79.0 males.

The median income for a household in the town was $31,705, and the median income for a family was $36,528. Males had a median income of $26,563 versus $18,839 for females. The per capita income for the town was $14,985. About 9.9% of families and 8.6% of the population were below the poverty line, including 10.8% of those under age 18 and 5.1% of those age 65 or over.

References

External links
 Encyclopedia of Oklahoma History and Culture - Helena
 James Crabtree Correctional Center

Towns in Alfalfa County, Oklahoma
Towns in Oklahoma